The Hammonasset people were Eastern Woodland Indians who had their "digging grounds" from the west bank of the Connecticut River to the Hammonasset River in Connecticut.

Culture
They spoke an Algonquian language. In the Eastern Woodlands Algonquian society, patrilineal clans with names appointed by animal totems made up the village-bands. The indigenous people who settled in the area named it Hammonasset, which roughly translates to “where we dig the ground.” They subsisted by fishing and hunting, and raised corn, beans, and squash. The Hammonasset River was one of the few to have salmon runs.

The first colonists arrived in the area in 1639. In 1640, Uncas, sachem of the Mohegan, added Sebequanash of the Hammonassets to his several wives . This marriage gave Uncas some type of control over their land which he promptly sold to New England colonists. The Hammonassets moved and became Mohegans.

They were once a band of Quinnipiac people, who were recorded living near Guilford, Connecticut. Their leader was named Sebequnash, or "The Man Who Weeps."

In 1730, the band's population was 250 to 300 people. By 1774, they were reduced to only 38 people. They moved to Farmington, Connecticut, to live among the Tunxis in 1768.

References

Native American history of Connecticut
New Haven County, Connecticut
Algonquian ethnonyms
Native American tribes in Connecticut